Medical law is the branch of law which concerns the prerogatives and responsibilities of medical professionals and the rights of the patient. It should not be confused with medical jurisprudence, which is a branch of medicine, rather than a branch of law.

Branches
Branches of medical law include:
 the law of torts (i.e. medical malpractice).
criminal law in relation to medical practice and treatment.
 the ethics of medical practice.
 health law and regulation

Administrative law 
Health professional's fitness to practise is regulated by medical licensing. If concerns are raised regarding a health professional the licensing body may choose to suspend or reject their license.

Education to work in medical law 
A career in Medical Law usually requires a bachelor's degree in bioethics, government, healthcare management or policy, public or global health, or history. Prospective medical lawyers must take the LSAT to apply and gain admission to Law School to obtain their Juris Doctor Degree. Finally, to further their education or obtain a higher position, Medical Lawyers may earn a Masters of Law Degree and/or a PhD in Healthcare Law or Global Law.

Career descriptions in the field of medical law 
 Reviewing medical documents, files, and receipts in connection with a medical lawsuit.
 Medical lawyers advise legal clients on their rights during trial.
 May keep evidence intact and preserved for trial (such as defective medicines or medical equipment).
 May interpret medical laws, standards, and guidelines in the area (they can often vary by region and by medical practice).
 Medical lawyers typically assist victims in obtaining a damages award to compensate them for their losses and injuries.
 Medical lawyers often represent clients in the healthcare industry in connection with general corporate matters, including corporate reorganization, capital financing, employee benefits, tax, and antitrust issues and general contract negotiation. They often provide advice regarding physician recruitment, acquisition of physician practices, and medical staff relations matters. Medical lawyers also provide guidance concerning Medicare and Medicaid fraud, abuse and payment issues, and telemedicine and health reform issues.

See also

Abortion law
Assault (tort) and Battery (tort), a form of trespass to the person
Bioethics
Competence (law)
Compulsory sterilization 
Conjoined twins
Consent (criminal law)
The Convention on Human Rights and Biomedicine
Euthanasia
Freedom of information
Health law, the body of healthcare legislation and government regulation
Inviolability 
Involuntary commitment
Involuntary treatment
Medical ethics
Medical malpractice 
Medical record
Privacy law
Quality of life (healthcare)
Reproductive rights
Reproductive technology
World Association for Medical Law

References

Notable cases
 Sorrell v. IMS Health Inc.
 Airedale NHS Trust v Bland [1993] 1 All ER 821 HL http://www.bailii.org/uk/cases/UKHL/1992/5.html
 Montgomery v Lanarkshire Health Board [2015] UKSC 11 https://web.archive.org/web/20180512202252/https://www.supremecourt.uk/decided-cases/docs/UKSC_2013_0136_Judgment.pdf

Further reading

External links
 Institute of Medicine & Law www.imlindia.com

 National Convention on Medicine & Law